Electro World may refer to:

 Electro World (retailer), a European electronics retailer operating in several countries
 Electro World (song), a 2006 single by the band Perfume